A list of players during the 2014 season in Girabola,  or Campeonato Nacional de Futebol em Séniores Masculinos, the top division of Angolan football.

List of Girabola players

See also
 Girabola
 Gira Angola

Expatriate footballers in Angola
Girabola
Association football player non-biographical articles